Twin Cinema is the third studio album by Canadian indie rock group The New Pornographers. It was released on August 23, 2005.  The album was shortlisted for the 2006 Polaris Music Prize. As of 2010 it has sold 138,000 copies in US and 20,000 copies in Canada.

Critical reception

Initial critical response to Twin Cinema was very positive. At Metacritic, which assigns to reviews from mainstream critics a normalized rating out of 100, the album has received a score of 85, based on 32 reviews. Online music magazine PopMatters ranked the album at #1 on their Best Music of 2005 list. Pitchfork placed Twin Cinema at number 150 on their list of Top 200 Albums of the 2000s, as well as at number 18 on their list of The 50 Best Indie Rock Albums of the Pacific Northwest.

Track listing

Personnel
The New Pornographers
A.C. Newman – vocals, guitar, ebow, synthesizer, harmonica, pump organ, xylophone
John Collins – bass, guitar, synthesizer, ebow, vocals
Kurt Dahle – drums, percussion, vocals
Dan Bejar – vocals, guitar, synthesizer, melodeon
Neko Case – vocals
Blaine Thurier – synthesizer
Todd Fancey – guitar
Kathryn Calder – vocals, piano

Additional personnel
Nora O'Connor – vocals
David Carswell – slide guitar, vocals
Shaun Brodie – trumpet
Todd Macdonald – mandolin
Tyr Jami – cello
Amy Tuyn – art work
Sarah Pedersen – photography
Howard Redekopp – engineer

References

External links
Twin Cinema at Matador Records

2005 albums
The New Pornographers albums
Mint Records albums
Albums produced by John Collins (Canadian musician)
Albums produced by David Carswell
Albums produced by A. C. Newman